John Mountney (born 22 February 1993) is an Irish professional footballer who plays as a midfielder, for League of Ireland Premier Division club Dundalk.

Club career

Early career
Having grown up in Bohola, County Mayo, Mountney began playing with Kiltimagh/Knock United and Ballina Town, during which time he was capped at U16 and U18 level. While at Ballina, he was selected in Sean McCaffrey's final international squad in August 2010, as he was chosen for the Jezek International Tournament in Czech Republic. There, Mountney came on for the second half of a 2-0 defeat by the host nation, before he played the full game against Ukraine where the Irish fell to a 3-0 loss.

Earlier that month, he scored an injury-time winner for Ballina against Westport United which was crucial in ensuring the Super League title. His performances in the latter part of the campaign earned him a place on the Team of the Year.

After being watched by Charlton Athletic and Burnley, Mountney joined Mervue United ahead of the 2011 League of Ireland First Division. He made his league debut when coming on as a second-half substitute against Athlone Town at the Athlone Town Stadium on 22 April 2011. Just six days after making his league debut, Mountney played for the Irish Schools U18s against England in the Centenary Shield and scored with a long-range strike that made the game 2-2.

In total, Mountney made 20 league appearances for Mervue United, including 17 starts, as the Galway club enjoyed their best season since entering the league in 2009, with a seventh-placed finish. It was these performances which attracted the attention of managers in the Premier Division and he joined Dundalk in January 2012.

Dundalk
Mountney made his Dundalk debut in a scoreless draw against Monaghan United at Gortakeegan on 2 March 2012. In the FAI Cup on 25 May 2012, the midfielder scored his first club goal with the decisive strike in a 1-0 win over St Patrick's CY at Oriel Park. 

Despite the overall poor performance of the team during the 2012 season, Mountney was one of the better players and earned a contract with Stephen Kenny for the 2013 season. He scored his first league goal for the club at the 30th attempt with the third in a 3-1 win away to Shelbourne on 15 March 2013. His 50th competitive appearance came in the 1-0 win over Sligo Rovers at The Showgrounds on 28 May 2013.

Despite a number of injury problems, Mountney featured in 23 matches in 2013 and found the net on two occasions, helping Dundalk secure second place in the League. He penned new deals committing himself to the club for both the 2014 and 2015 seasons. Playing more games than anyone else in 2015, he added a League and FAI Cup Double to the League and League Cup medals won in 2014. In October 2015, Mountney signed a new contract for the 2016 campaign.

Mountney remained a key member of the side for Dundalk's three-in-a-row League title success in 2016 and, despite some injury setbacks, won more honours as Dundalk won both the League title and the FAI Cup in 2018 - the club completing its second Double in four seasons. Mountney signed a two-year contract extension at the end of the 2018 season. On 21 December, it was announced that Mountney had departed Dundalk after nine seasons at the club.

St Patrick's Athletic
On 7 January 2021, it was announced that Mountney had signed for Dublin club St Patrick's Athletic, managed by his former Dundalk captain Stephen O'Donnell. After signing for the club, O'Donnell asked Mountney to tell his new teammates how they were regarded by a title-winning team (Mountney's Dundalk team) as a motivational tactic. He made his debut for the club in the opening game of the season, playing at right back in a 1–1 draw away to Shamrock Rovers in a Dublin derby on 19 March 2021. He scored his first goal for the Saints on 30 July 2021 with a deflected free kick from 30 yards away to Shamrock Rovers in what was his 350th career appearance. Mountney suffered a cruciate ligament injury in a 4–1 win away to his old club Dundalk on 8 August 2021, an injury that put him out for the rest of the season. On 28 November 2021 his club won the 2021 FAI Cup Final, beating rivals Bohemians 4–3 on penalties following a 1–1 draw after extra time in front of a record FAI Cup Final crowd of 37,126 at the Aviva Stadium with Mountney missing out through injury but receiving a medal following his appearance in the first round of the tournament.

Return to Dundalk
On 24 December 2021, it was announced that Mountney had followed head coach Stephen O'Donnell back to Dundalk for a second spell at the club.

Career statistics

Honours
Dundalk
Premier Division: 5
2014, 2015, 2016, 2018, 2019
FAI Cup: 3
2015, 2018, 2020
League of Ireland Cup: 3
2014, 2017, 2019
Leinster Senior Cup: 1
2015
President's Cup: 2
2015, 2019
Champion's Cup: 1
2019

St Patrick's Athketic
FAI Cup: 1
2021

References

Living people
1993 births
Republic of Ireland association footballers
Mervue United A.F.C. players
Dundalk F.C. players
St Patrick's Athletic F.C. players
League of Ireland players
Association football midfielders